The rivière du Mont Saint-Étienne (English: Mont Saint-Etienne river) is a tributary of the Sainte-Anne river, flowing on the north bank of the Saint Lawrence River, in the unorganized territory of Lac-Jacques-Cartier and the municipality of Saint-Ferréol-les-Neiges, in the La Côte-de-Beaupré Regional County Municipality, in the administrative region of Capitale-Nationale, in the province of Quebec, in Canada.

The lower part of this small valley is served by chemin de l'Abitibi-Price, chemin du rang Saint-Marie and chemin Clairval. Chemin du rang Saint-Édouard runs southwest of the middle part of the river course. The upper part is served by a secondary forest road passing on the north side of the river and which connects to the southeast with the Abitibi-Price road. Forestry is the main economic activity in this valley; recreational tourism, second.

The surface of the lower part of the Mont Saint-Étienne river is generally frozen from the beginning of December until the end of March; however, safe traffic on the ice is generally from mid-December to mid-March. The upper part has a freezing period of about an additional week. The water level of the river varies with the seasons and the precipitation; the spring flood occurs in March or April.

Geography 
The Mont Saint-Étienne river rises at the mouth of second Lynch Lake, on the northwest side of Mont Saint-Étienne, in the unorganized territory of Lac-Jacques-Cartier. This lake wedged between the mountains has two outlets: one flows west descending towards the rivière du Camp Brûlé passing through First Lynch Lake; the other east along the Mont Saint-Étienne river. This second mouth of the lake (East side) is located at:
  south-east of the course of the rivière du Camp Brûlé;
  north of the top of a mountain;
  south of another mountain peak;
  at south-West of the summet of Saint-Étienne Mountain;
  west of the mouth of Mont Saint-Étienne.

This river bypasses Mont Saint-Étienne.
  towards the northeast in particular by crossing a first lake, then crossing Lake Mont Saint-Étienne (altitude) over its full length, up to the dam at its mouth;
  towards the south-east by forming a loop towards the south-west and collecting a stream (coming from the north-east), up to the South-West Arm of the Rivière du Mont Saint-Etienne (coming from the southwest);
  towards the south-east by forming a curve towards the west and collecting a stream (coming from the west), up to a stream (coming from the north);
  towards the east by forming a curve towards the south, up to the chemin du rang Sainte-Marie;
  north-east passing under the bridge of Chemin de l'Abitibi-Price, to its mouth.

The Mont Saint-Étienne river flows on the southwest bank of the Sainte-Anne River (Beaupré), in Saint-Ferréol-les-Neiges.

From the confluence of the Mont Saint-Étienne river, the current flows over  generally towards the southwest by the course of the Sainte-Anne River, crossing downtown Beaupré, to the northwest shore of Saint Lawrence River.

Toponymy 
The toponym "rivière du Mont Saint-Étienne" was formalized on December 5, 1968 at the Place Names Bank of the Commission de toponymie du Québec.

References

See also 

 Capitale-Nationale, an administrative region
 La Côte-de-Beaupré Regional County Municipality
 Lac-Jacques-Cartier, an unorganized territory
 Saint-Ferréol-les-Neiges, a municipality
 Sainte-Anne River (Beaupré)
 St. Lawrence River
 List of rivers of Quebec

Rivers of Capitale-Nationale
La Côte-de-Beaupré Regional County Municipality